Aminatou Seyni (born 24 October 1996) is a Nigerien track and field sprinter.

She has the Nigerien national records for the 200 metres and 400 metres.

Seyni competed in the women's 100 metres and 200 metres at the 2019 African Games. She reached the semifinals in the women's 100 metres. She finished in 4th place in the women's 200 metres final.

She competed in the women's 200 metres at the 2019 World Athletics Championships. She could not compete in the women's 400 metres due to the IAAF's regulations on testosterone levels for athletes with XY disorders of sex development in women's competition.

She competed in the women's 200 metres at the 2020 Summer Olympics.

Achievements

International competitions

Personal bests

References

External links

Living people
1996 births
Nigerien female sprinters
World Athletics Championships athletes for Niger
Athletes (track and field) at the 2019 African Games
Place of birth missing (living people)
African Games competitors for Niger
Athletes (track and field) at the 2020 Summer Olympics
Olympic female sprinters
Olympic athletes of Niger
Intersex sportspeople
Intersex women
African Championships in Athletics winners